"Blowin' Up (Don't Stop the Music)" is the second single released by rap group, Quo from their debut album, Quo. The single was released on September 20, 1994, was produced by Teddy Riley and featured guest vocals from Aaron Hall. It was a minor success, peaking at 25 on the Hot Rap Singles and 90 on the Hot R&B/Hip-Hop Songs.

The music was sampled from Don't Stop the Music by Yarbrough and Peoples.

Eazy-E appeared as a cameo in the music video.

Track listing

A-Side
"Blowin' Up (Don't Stop The Music)" (Teddy Riley Mix - Single Version)- 3:54
"Blowin' Up (Don't Stop The Music)" (Teddy Riley Mix - Extended Version)- 4:30)
"Blowin' Up (Don't Stop The Music)" (D.J. Wynn Mix)- 4:26

B-Side
"Blowin' Up (Don't Stop The Music)" (Tru / G Street Mix)- 3:58
"Blowin' Up (Don't Stop The Music)" (Acappella)- 4:50
"Blowin' Up (Don't Stop The Music)" (Instrumental)- 4:51

1994 singles
Quo (group) songs
Song recordings produced by Teddy Riley
1994 songs